Perce Dempsey Tabler (November 23, 1876 – June 7, 1956) was a Tennessee-born opera singer, athlete, businessman and actor, remembered for being the third actor to portray Tarzan in films.

His sole outing in the role came in the 1920 movie serial The Son of Tarzan, based on the Edgar Rice Burroughs novel of the same name, which focused on Korak, the son of Tarzan and Jane.

Following The Son of Tarzan, Tabler made only one more film, 1923's Spawn of the Desert.

Notes

References
Essoe, Gabe, Tarzan of the Movies  (Citadel Press, 1968)

External links
 

American male film actors
American male silent film actors
1876 births
1956 deaths
20th-century American male actors